Baryssinus modestus is a species of longhorn beetle in the family Cerambycidae. It was described by Monné in 1985.

References

Baryssinus
Beetles described in 1985